Boulengerula fischeri is a species of caecilian in the family Herpelidae. It is endemic to Rwanda and only known from around its type locality near Cyangugu, southwestern Rwanda. The specific name fischeri honours Eberhard Fischer, a German botanist who has worked with Rwandan fauna and flora. Common name Fischer's African caecilian has been coined for it. Live animals have the appearance of "live pink spaghetti".

Description
Adult males measure  and adult females  in total length. The holotype is an immature female  in total length. There are 183–205 primary annuli. Colouration is pinkish, with the head and neck and the posterior few centimeters of the body a brighter pink than the midbody, or a paler pink head, vivid pink anteriorly, and the body becoming more lavender posteriorly.

Habitat and conservation
It lives in the soil, occasionally on the ground under leaf litter or plant stems. If similar to other Boulengerula, it would be oviparous and have direct development (no free-living larvae).

This species is locally abundant and tolerates some habitat modification. It could be threatened by deforestation and agricultural intensification, including the use of agrochemicals. The area of the type locality is now included in the Nyungwe Forest National Park.

References 

fischeri
Endemic fauna of Rwanda
Amphibians of Rwanda
Amphibians described in 1994
Taxonomy articles created by Polbot
Taxa named by Ronald Archie Nussbaum